= Brite Winter Music & Arts Festival =

Brite Winter is a music and arts festival held annually in Cleveland, Ohio with the mission of embracing Cleveland's winter "by celebrating with light, fire, art, music, games and snow." Hosting its inaugural event in 2010, Brite Winter has since grown to a six-stage, 60-band event. The event hosted 20,000 attendees at its 2015 festival.

== History ==
The Brite Winter Music & Arts Festival was founded in 2010 by Emily Hornack and Jimmy Harris. Some of the funding for the 2014 festival was acquired through corporate sponsors and a Kickstarter campaign with a $4,000 goal. The 2014 event had over 20,000 attendees.
